Héctor Humberto Hernández Gallegos (born 15 June 1985) is a Mexican basketball player for Libertadores de Querétaro of the Liga Nacional de Baloncesto Profesional (LNBP) and the Mexico national team. He participated at the 2014 FIBA Basketball World Cup.

Honours

FIBA COCABA Championship 2013 Gold Medal 
Pan American Games 2011  Silver Medal

References

External links
RealGM profile
Fresno State bio

1985 births
Living people
Basketball players at the 2011 Pan American Games
Basketball players at the 2015 Pan American Games
Basketball players from Chihuahua
Bucaneros de La Guaira players
Capitanes de Ciudad de México players
Mexican expatriate basketball people in Puerto Rico
Fresno State Bulldogs men's basketball players
Fuerza Regia de Monterrey players
Halcones de Xalapa players
Maccabi Haifa B.C. players
Mexican expatriate basketball people in the United States
Mexican expatriate basketball people in Israel
Mexican expatriate sportspeople in Puerto Rico
Mexican men's basketball players
Ostioneros de Guaymas (basketball) players
Pan American Games medalists in basketball
Pan American Games silver medalists for Mexico
People from Chihuahua City
Pioneros de Quintana Roo players
Power forwards (basketball)
Small forwards
2014 FIBA Basketball World Cup players
Medalists at the 2011 Pan American Games
Astros de Jalisco players